Malaysia competed in the 1967 Southeast Asian Peninsular Games held in Bangkok, Thailand from 9 to 16 December 1967.

Medal summary

Medals by sport

Medallists

References

1967